Ben E. Espy is a Democratic politician who formerly served in the Ohio Senate.  A member of Columbus City Council from 1982 to 1992, Espy went on to obtain an appointment to the Ohio Senate after Senator Richard Pfeiffer resigned in 1992.  He won election to fill the remainder of the term in 1992, and to a full term in 1994.

By 1994, Espy had been chosen to serve as assistant Senate minority leader, and by 1996, he was minority leader.  He won a second term in 1998.

In 1999, Espy challenged Columbus Mayor Michael Coleman in the Democratic primary for mayor, but lost.  He subsequently resigned his minority leader post, and served the remainder of his term in the Senate as a lame duck.  Term limited in 2002, he left office and was replaced by Ray Miller.

Espy returned to private law practice, and also went on to serve as a special counsel to the Ohio Attorney General Marc Dann.  He continues to reside in Columbus, Ohio. He is also a Prince Hall Freemason.

See also
Columbus, Ohio mayoral election, 1991

References

Further reading

Living people
Democratic Party Ohio state senators
Columbus City Council members
21st-century American politicians
Year of birth missing (living people)